Elections to Newcastle-under-Lyme Borough Council were held on 2 May 2002.  The whole council was up for election with boundary changes since the last election in 2000 increasing the number of seats by four. The Labour Party lost overall control of the council to no overall control.

Three seats in Thistleberry ward were vacant until a by-election in June.

Election result

Ward results

References
2002 Newcastle-under-Lyme election result

2002
2002 English local elections
2000s in Staffordshire